Joan R. Piggott (born 1947) is an American historian specializing in East Asian studies.

Education
Piggott completed a master of arts from Stanford University in 1972, followed by a doctorate from Stanford in 1987.

Career
Piggott began her academic career at the University of Miami, where she was an assistant professor of history from 1987 until 1989. Between 1989 and 1995, Piggott held an assistant professorship in history at Cornell University, where she was promoted to associate professor. In 2003, Piggott accepted an appointment as Gordon L. MacDonald Chair in History at the University of Southern California.

Selected publications

References

1947 births
Living people
20th-century American women writers
21st-century American women writers
American women historians
20th-century American historians
21st-century American historians
American Japanologists
Historians of Japan
University of Southern California faculty
Stanford University alumni
Cornell University faculty
University of Miami faculty